Mass No. 6 may refer to:

 Mass No. 6 (Haydn), Missa Sancti Nicolai in G major, by Joseph Haydn
 Mass No. 6 (Mozart), in honorem Sanctissimae Trinitatis in C major, by Wolfgang Amadeus Mozart
 Mass No. 6 (Schubert), in E-flat major, by Franz Schubert